"Junk" is a song written by English musician Paul McCartney and released on his debut studio album McCartney (1970). He wrote the song in 1968 with the Beatles while the group were studying Transcendental Meditation in India. After the band's return from India, he recorded the song as a demo at Kinfauns, George Harrison's home, before sessions for The Beatles (also known as "the White Album") took place. It was ultimately passed over for inclusion on The Beatles and Abbey Road in 1969. After the group's break-up, McCartney recorded the song for inclusion on McCartney. The lyrics describe various items in a junkyard. A slightly longer, instrumental version of the song, titled "Singalong Junk", also appears on the album.

History
McCartney wrote "Junk", along with another McCartney track "Teddy Boy", during the Beatles' visit to India in 1968. The song was one of several the Beatles demoed at George Harrison's Kinfauns home before the recording of The Beatles in May 1968. The Esher demo was eventually released on Anthology 3 in 1996 and on the Super Deluxe edition of the "White Album" in 2018. While the song was considered for The Beatles (also known as the "White Album"), it was not included; neither did it find a place on Abbey Road. McCartney eventually recorded the song, along with "Teddy Boy", in February 1970 for his debut solo album McCartney. The song's working title was "Jubilee"; it was also known as "Junk in the Yard". Take one appeared on the McCartney album as "Singalong Junk", whereas take two was issued as "Junk".

"Junk" was included on an EP (along with "Another Day", "Oh Woman, Oh Why" and "Valentine Day") released only in Mexico. Although the song has been dropped from his live setlist, his affinity for the tune (without vocal hence 'Singalong Junk') is plainly shown by its inclusion in his famed MTV Unplugged set as recently as 1992, (nearly 25 years after it was originally written) while the credits roll, and was included on the compilations Wingspan: Hits and History (2001) and Pure McCartney (2016).

Composition
The lyrics of "Junk" have McCartney describe numerous contents of a junk shop, including parachutes, army boots, and sleeping bags for two. The song's chorus ("Buy, buy, says the sign in the shop window/why, why, says the junk in the yard") illustrates what it's like for these items. Beside the exclusion of vocals, "Singalong Junk" features mellotron strings and the melody is played on a piano. That version also features more prominent drums. "Singalong Junk" is said to have been the original instrumental backing over which McCartney planned to sing, but he opted for a simpler arrangement for the vocal version instead.

Reception
Since release, "Junk" has received positive reviews from music critics, with many considering it a highlight of its parent album. In a review for McCartney on initial release, Langdon Winner of Rolling Stone complimented the album's use of simplicity, saying that it "works very well". Winner praised "Junk" and "Teddy Boy", describing both as "low pressure compositions with gentle, poignant lessons to convey" that are "very tasteful and fun to listen to."

Donald A. Guarisco of AllMusic considers "Junk" one of the "finest moments" on McCartney, describing it as "a melancholy charmer of a ballad that has become a cult favorite with McCartney fans." Guarisco further praises McCartney's vocal performance, writing that it "captures [the song's] wistful mood nicely." In a retrospective review for McCartney, Record Collector has highlighted "Junk", along with "Every Night" and "Maybe I'm Amazed", as songs that "still sound absolutely effortless and demonstrate the man's natural genius with a melody". Joe Tangari of Pitchfork similarly evaluated both "Junk" and "Singalong Junk", with "Maybe I'm Amazed", as the "peaks" of McCartney.

Personnel
"Junk"
Paul McCartney – lead vocals, acoustic guitars, bass guitar, xylophone, drums

"Singalong Junk"
Paul McCartney – acoustic and electric guitar, bass guitar, piano, mellotron, drums

Live versions
 "Junk" appeared on McCartney's 1991 album Unplugged (The Official Bootleg) but is played without vocals, thereby making it "Singalong Junk", but it is not listed as such on the album.
 McCartney first performed "Junk" live, in the Ghost Suite at the Royal Albert Hall, on 3 November 2006.

Cover versions
 Chet Atkins on Pickin' My Way, 1970
 Roger Williams on Love Story, 1971
 Cilla Black on Images, 1971
 John Denver on Poems, Prayers, and Promises, 1971
 Anne Sofie von Otter and Elvis Costello on  For the Stars, 2001, combined in a medley with Broken Bicycles by Tom Waits
 Jeff Lynne on The Art of McCartney, 2014

Media appearances
"Singalong Junk" was included in the soundtrack of the movie Hanging Up (2000).
An instrumental version was included in the French film My Wife Is an Actress (2001).
"Singalong Junk" was also included in the Jerry Maguire soundtrack.
It also appears in the opening episode of Season 3 of Parenthood.

References

Bibliography
 
 
 

The Beatles songs
1970 songs
Songs written by Paul McCartney
Song recordings produced by Paul McCartney
Paul McCartney songs
Music published by MPL Music Publishing